Conquistador! is a 1968 studio album recorded in 1966 by free jazz pianist Cecil Taylor, released by Blue Note Records.

Critical reception 
Writing for AllMusic, Scott Yanow gave the album 4.5 out of 5 stars, stating that "During the two lengthy pieces, [Jimmy] Lyons' passionate solos contrast with [Bill] Dixon's quieter ruminations while the music in general is unremittingly intense."

The authors of The Penguin Guide to Jazz awarded the album 4 stars, calling it "an all but flawless record," and commenting: "Dark, difficult, unique, yet operating at an artful tangent to some of the other 'difficult' Blue Note music of the period, this is Taylor at his most devious."

Writing for Vinyl Me Please, Brian Josephs stated: "Conquistador!... swerves away from Unit Structures''' fire and evokes the coolness of its cover, which features a turtlenecked Taylor slightly out of focus, hiding behind shades as he mysteriously stares into the distance. The musical elements don’t combust as much as they melt into each other: Horns swell shrilly at the borders to add haunted textures, while Andrew Cyrille's amorphous rhythms tie the masterwork together. Even without Unit Structures as its contrast, Conquistador! still stands as a great testament to this sui generis collective."

In 2008, The New Yorker'' placed it at number 87 on the "100 Essential Jazz Albums" list.

Track listing

Personnel
Credits adapted from liner notes.

 Cecil Taylor – piano
 Bill Dixon – trumpet
 Jimmy Lyons – alto saxophone
 Henry Grimes – double bass
 Alan Silva – double bass
 Andrew Cyrille – drums

References

External links 
 

1968 albums
Blue Note Records albums
Cecil Taylor albums
Albums produced by Alfred Lion
Albums recorded at Van Gelder Studio